Seow Tian Chye, known as Ye Fong (died September 1995), was a Singaporean comedian. He was part of a Singaporean comedy duo, with Wang Sa, who were akin to the Laurel and Hardy of the East.

Ye often performed with Wang as a comedy duo at the New World Amusement Park and on television in the 1960s and 1970s. 

Ye, in his first film role in The Crazy Bumpkins, won the Best Comedy Actor in the 20th Asia Pacific Film Festival in 1974.

Ye died of a heart attack in September 1995.

At the Star Awards 2003, Ye together with Wang, were awarded posthumously the 40th Anniversary Evergreen Achievement Award.

References

Singaporean television personalities
1995 deaths